Kali River Bridge was constructed over the Kali river in the city of Karwar in Uttara Kannada district, Karnataka. It was built in 1983. The bridge connects the state of Karnataka with Goa by road. The Sadashivgad Fort of Sadashivgad is located next to this bridge.

See also

References

Bridges in Karnataka
Buildings and structures in Uttara Kannada district
Bridges completed in 1986
Transport in Uttara Kannada district
1986 establishments in Karnataka
20th-century architecture in India